Kolartsi is a village in Tervel Municipality, Dobrich Province, in northeastern Bulgaria. Olympian Georgi Keranov was born here.

References

Villages in Dobrich Province